Trueways Survival School is a survival training organisation providing major media sources such as Sky News and The Times newspaper with advice and guidance with regard to wilderness survival, military survival, expedition preparation and urban survival as well as providing guidance on related entertainment based television content such as the BBC Survivors (2008 TV series).

Trueways has also provided photography and images for the new edition of the bestselling book, Ultimate SAS Survival [Special Edition] (Hardcover).

Among the experts that form the Trueways Survival team is Lofty Wiseman, who plays an active part in many of the organisations training areas and activities.

Publications and Media
 Trueways Survival Skills with Lofty Wiseman (DVD)

References

Privately held companies of the United Kingdom
Survival training